British Columbia is the third-most populated province in Canada and has a rich history of professional sports. Most professional sports teams in the province reside in the major metropolitan areas of Vancouver.

Ice hockey

Soccer

Other sports

See also
Professional sports in Canada
List of professional sports teams in Canada by city

References

Sports in Canada by province or territory